Chorinea octauius (octauius swordtail) is a species of butterfly of the family Riodinidae. It is found in South America.

Subspecies
Chorinea octauius octauius (Guianas, Surinam, Trinidad, Venezuela)
Chorinea octauius orchestris Stichel, 1910 (Peru)

References

Riodinini
Butterflies described in 1787